The thirteenth season of American talent show competition series America's Got Talent was broadcast on NBC from May 29 to September 19, 2018. There were no major changes to the program during the season; the guest judges for this season's Judge Cuts episodes were Ken Jeong, Olivia Munn, Martina McBride, and Chris Hardwick.

The thirteenth season was won by close-up magician Shin Lim, with acrobatic group Zurcaroh finishing second, and electric violinist Brian King Joseph placing third. During its broadcast, the season averaged around 11.15 million viewers.

Season overview 
Open auditions were held in late 2017 within Orlando, Cincinnati, Savannah, Milwaukee, Houston, Las Vegas, New York City, Nashville, and Los Angeles (while online auditions were accepted). As in previous years, the judges' auditions were held and filmed in March 2017 at the Pasadena Civic Auditorium in Los Angeles. The Judge Cuts episodes included actor Ken Jeong, actress Olivia Munn, singer Martina McBride and comedian Chris Hardwick appearing as guest judges. Simon Cowell interrupted the performances of two singers during the Judge Cuts asking them to sing a different song because he disliked their original choice.

Thirty-six of the participants auditioning secured a place in the live quarter-finals, with twelve quarter-finalists appearing in each of the shows. Among the contestants: acrobatic group Zurcaroh, singer Michael Ketterer, singer Courtney Hadwin, singer Amanda Mena, and singer Makayla Phillips who had each received a golden buzzer from the main judges and host; choir Voices of Hope, choir Angel City Chorale, ballroom dancers Quin and Misha, and rapper Flau’jae who had each received a Golden Buzzer from the guest judges; opera singer Daniel Emmet, novelty water-spitting act Human Fountains, and multimedia performance group Front Pictures who were chosen as Wildcard quarter-finalists. Twenty-two quarter-finalists advanced and appeared in two semi-finals (eleven in each show), including Front Pictures which was chosen again by the judges (as the Wildcard semi-finalist); ten semi-finalists securing a place in the finals. The chart below lists the results of each participant's overall performance in this season:

 |  |  |  | 
 |  Wildcard Quarter-finalist |  Wildcard Semi-finalist
 Golden Buzzer - Auditions |  Golden Buzzer - Judge Cuts

  Ages denoted for a participant(s), pertain to their final performance for this season.

Quarter-finals summary
 Buzzed Out |  Judges' choice | 
 |  |

Quarter-final 1 (August 14) 
Guest Performer, Results Show: Darci Lynne

Quarter-final 2 (August 21) 
Guest Performers, Results Show: The Illusionists, and Light Balance

  Front Pictures were later appointed as the judges' WildCard semi-finalist.

Quarter-final 3 (August 28) 
Guest Performers, Results Show: Cast of Beautiful: The Carole King Musical

Semi-finals summary
 Buzzed Out |  Judges' choice | 
 |  |

Semi-final 1 (September 4)

Semi-final 2 (September 11) 
Guest Performers, Results Show: BTS and cast of A Magical Cirque Christmas

Finals (September 18–19)
Guest Performers, Finale: Kiss

 |  |  | 

  Brian King Joseph & Duo Transcend conducted a joint routine for their second performance, and thus shared the same guest performer.

Ratings
The following ratings are based upon those published by Nielsen Media Research after this season's broadcast:

Specials

References

2018 American television seasons
America's Got Talent seasons